Stanislav Aleksandrovich Ossinskiy (born 23 April 1984 in Quaraghandy) is a male backstroke swimmer from Kazakhstan, who twice competed for his native country at the Summer Olympics: 2004 and 2008. His best result was finishing in 41st place in the men's 100m backstroke event in Athens, Greece (2004).

References
 sports-reference

1984 births
Living people
Kazakhstani male backstroke swimmers
Swimmers at the 2004 Summer Olympics
Swimmers at the 2008 Summer Olympics
Olympic swimmers of Kazakhstan
Sportspeople from Karaganda
Asian Games medalists in swimming
Swimmers at the 2006 Asian Games
Swimmers at the 2010 Asian Games
Swimmers at the 2014 Asian Games
Medalists at the 2010 Asian Games
Asian Games bronze medalists for Kazakhstan
20th-century Kazakhstani people
21st-century Kazakhstani people